Sigaus of grasshoppers in the tribe Catantopini that isendemic to New Zealand, and all but one species is endemic to the South Island: Sigaus piliferus is the only North Island representative and is the type species. There are eight species in the genus; all are flightless, and many are coloured for camouflage against rocky ground. Sigaus minutus and S. childi are threatened with extinction.

Taxonomy 
The taxonomy of New Zealand endemic grasshoppers was substantially revised by Bigelow in 1967, based mostly on female genitalia. The genus Sigaus is distinguished from other New Zealand Acrididae by the distinctive structures of the internal male genitalia: the epiphallus lophi are saddle-like in shape with the mesal protuberance of the lophus having a smooth, rounded outline. The genus is not however monophyletic with respect to other New Zealand grasshoppers.

References

External links

Sigaus discussed on RNZ Critter of the Week, 3 March 2017
 Citizen science observations in iNaturalist

Acrididae of New Zealand
Acrididae genera
Endemic fauna of New Zealand
Endemic insects of New Zealand